is a Japanese singer-songwriter. He debuted on a major label in 2010, with his singles "Subarashiki Nichijō" and "Honto no Kimochi".

Biography
Takahashi grew up in Yokote, Akita, in the Tōhoku region of Japan. He started to learn the electric guitar in his final year of middle school, and in high school became the vocalist of a hardcore copy band for two years, performing such songs as Hide with Spread Beaver's "Pink Spider". During high school, he bought a cheap acoustic guitar, and began writing songs. His band broke up as the members went their separate ways, and Takahashi moved to Sapporo to attend a university. He performed in a band in Sapporo as well, however, due to the band dissolution (one member's love life took priority) Takahashi decided to become a solo musician.

In February 2002, Takahashi released his debut album, the self-produced Sepia, of which only 200 copies were produced. Over the next five years, Takahashi performed concerts and released albums based in Sapporo, such as in January 2004, when he performed street lives five times per week. In May 2007, he released his second album, Mugon no Bōryoku, limited to 500 copies. The album was relatively popular in Sapporo, charting at number 1 for three weeks at the Sapporo Stellar Place HMV's in-store independent releases charts. This lead him to hold his first solo concert, to 200 people at the Sapporo Colony. In September 2007, Takahashi began performing monthly live concerts titled , in which he would rent a CD shop and only allow 30 people to come inside for the concert.

Takahashi moved to Tokyo in January 2008, to further his music career there. He performed many different concerts, and released a third self-released album, Agura, which was sold only at concert venues. He was scouted by Amuse, an artist management firm especially known for their management of musicians, and came to the notice of Michihiko Yanai, creator of Tower Records' No Music, No Life and Kaze to Rock campaigns. This led to Takahashi releasing his first independent single, the Tower Records exclusive "Kodomo no Uta" in May 2009, followed by his first wide-release album in July, the extended play Bokura no Heisei Rock 'n' Roll, which was produced by Yanai. The extended play reached number 262 on Oricon's national album charts.

A year later, Takahashi made his major label debut under Warner, with the single "Subarashiki Nichijō". The song received heavy radio play, causing it to reach number 5 on Billboard'''s Japan Hot 100 chart, despite only reaching number 57 on Oricon's physical single sales chart. His second single, "Honto no Kimochi", was used as the theme song for the Takeru Satoh and Atsuko Maeda (AKB48) starring drama Q10, giving Takahashi his first top 30 single and his first performance on music show Music Station''.

Since the summer of 2016, he has hosted AKITA CARAVAN MUSIC FES every year in his hometown Akita Prefecture.
 
He announced to leave Amuse Inc. on June 30, 2020.  Then he set up a personal office with his manager.

Discography

Studio albums

Compilation albums

Extended plays

Singles

As a lead artist

As a featured artist

Promotional singles

Video albums

Notes

References

External links 
Official site 
Warner label site 

Rin to...inc.

1983 births
People from Yokote, Akita
Japanese male singer-songwriters
Japanese singer-songwriters
Living people
Warner Music Japan artists
Musicians from Akita Prefecture
Amuse Inc. talents
21st-century Japanese singers
21st-century Japanese male singers